Sarah Hammond (born 9 October 1975) is an Australian handball player. She competed in the women's tournament at the 2000 Summer Olympics.

References

External links
 

1975 births
Living people
Australian female handball players
Olympic handball players of Australia
Handball players at the 2000 Summer Olympics
Sportspeople from Melbourne